The Panasonic Lumix DMC-CM1 is a large-sensor camera smartphone announced by Panasonic on 15 September, 2014 and released in December of the same year in Germany, France and Great Britain only. It was also released in the USA later, in summer 2015.

Description

To date, the Panasonic Lumix DMC-CM1 is the smartphone with the largest sensor, surpassing the Nokia 808 Pureview (2012) with 1/1.2" sensor, and the slimmest camera with 1" sensor at the same time. It is also the only smartphone that takes any external lens (37mm or any other with a step ring) like any other dedicated camera. 

The combination of an f/2.8 lens and 1 inch sensor give it a hitherto unprecedented ability for (unsimulated) shallow depth of field. Forbes reserved judgement on the image quality given review samples were not available, writing "it remains to be seen whether a 1-inch sensor and Leica lens is enough to elevate the image quality of DMC-CM1 sufficiently high above the best smartphones".

It is able to record video with 2160p at 15 frames per second and 1080p at 30 frames per second. It is equipped with manual camera controls and allows for a maximum light sensitivity of ISO 25600.

References

Hands-on: Panasonic Lumix CM1 review: Is it a camera, is it a phone? It's a bit of both
Panasonic announces Lumix DMC-CM1 smartphone with 1-inch sensor

 

Mobile phones introduced in 2014
Panasonic Lumix cameras
Digital cameras with CMOS image sensor
Cameras introduced in 2014